Shuddhi or Suddhi can refer to:

Shuddhi (film), a 2017 Indian Kannada-language film
Shuddhi (Hinduism)
Purity in Buddhism

See also

Suddha (disambiguation)